Vietnamese units of measurement are the largely decimal units of measurement traditionally used in Vietnam until metrication. The base unit of length is the thước (chữ Nôm: 𡱩; lit. "ruler") or xích. Some of the traditional unit names have been repurposed for metric units, such as thước for the metre, while other traditional names remain in translations of imperial units, such as dặm Anh for the English mile.

History
Originally, many thước of varying lengths were in use in Vietnam, each used for different purposes. According to Hoàng Phê (1988), the traditional system of units had at least two thước of different lengths before 1890, the thước ta (lit.

Annam retained the old standard for measuring land, so distance and area (such as sào) in Annam were 4.7/4 and (4.7/4)2 times the equivalent units in Tonkin, respectively.

Length
The following table lists common units of length in Vietnam in the early 20th century, according to a United Nations Statistical Commission handbook:

Notes:
The thước is also called thước ta to distinguish it from the metre (thước tây, lit. "Western ruler"). Other than for measuring length, the thước is also used for measuring land area (see below).
According to the UN handbook, some areas unofficially use 1 trượng = . According to Hoàng Phê (1988), the trượng has two definitions: 10 Chinese chi (about 3.33 m) or 4 thước mộc (about 1.70 m).
The tấc is also given as túc. According to the UN handbook, some areas unofficially use 1 tấc = .

Miscellaneous units:

chai vai
1 chai vai = 
dặm
According to Hoàng Phê (1988), 1 dặm = . According to Vĩnh Cao and Nguyễn Phố (2001), 1 dặm =  xích (Chinese chi) = 
lý or lí
According to Vĩnh Cao and Nguyễn Phố (2001), there are two kinds of lý: 1 công lý = 1 km =  xích, while thị lý is a traditional unit equal to  xích.
sải

Area
The following table lists common units of area in Vietnam in the early 20th century, according to the UN handbook:

Notes:
Annamite units of area were 2 times those of other areas, due to units of length (trượng, tấc, etc.) being  times those of other areas, as explained above.
According to the UN handbook, the phân is also written phấn.
The sào is also given as cao. Tonkin and Annam had different definitions of the sào.

Miscellaneous units:

công or công đất
dặm vuông
The dặm vuông measures 1 dặm × 1 dặm.

Volume
The following table lists common units of volume in Vietnam in the early 20th century, according to the UN handbook and Thiều Chửu:

Additionally:
1 phương of husked rice = 13 thăng or 30 bát (bowls) in 1804
1 vuông of husked rice = 604 gr 50
1 phương or vuông or commonly giạ = , though it is sometimes given as 1 phương = ½ hộc or about 30 L
It was commonly used for measuring rice and salt.
1 túc = 
1 uyên = 

The following table lists units of volume in use during French administration in Cochinchina:

Notes:
Unhusked rice was measured in hộc while husked rice was measured in vuông because a hộc of unhusked rice becomes 1 vuông after husking.
1 hộc of unhusked rice weighs 1 tạ.

Miscellaneous units:
thùng
In Cochinchina and Cambodia, 1 thùng (lit. "bucket") = . The thùng is also given as tau.

Weight
The following table lists common units of weight in Vietnam in the early 20th century:

Notes:
The cân (lit. "scale") is also called cân ta ("our scale") to distinguish it from the kilogram (cân tây, "Western scale").
The 375-gram value is consistent with the system of units for measuring precious metals.
The đồng is also called đồng cân, to distinguish it from monetary uses.
The French colonial administration defined some additional units for use in trade: nén = 2 thoi = 10 đính = 10 lượng

Units for measuring precious metals:
The lạng, also called cây or lượng, is equal to 10 chỉ. 1 cây = 
1 chỉ = 

Miscellaneous units:
binh

Time
canh (更)
giờ

Currency  

Traditionally, the basic units of Vietnamese currency were quan (貫, quán), tiền, and đồng. One quan was 10 tiền, and one tiền was between 50 and 100 đồng, depending on the time period.

From the reign of Emperor Trần Thái Tông onward, 1 tiền was 69 đồng in ordinary commercial transactions but 1 tiền was 70 đồng for official transactions.
From the reign of Emperor Lê Lợi, 1 tiền was decreed to be 50 đồng.
The smaller coinage was called tiền gián or sử tiền, in contrast to the larger tiền quý (literally, "valuable cash") or cổ tiền. One quan tiền quý was equivalent to 600 đồng, while 1 quan tiền gián was only 360 đồng.
During the Later Lê dynasty, 1 tiền was 60 đồng; therefore, 600 đồng was 1 quan.
During the Yuan dynasty, Vietnamese traders at the border with China used the rate 1 tiền to 67 đồng.
Zinc coins began to appear in Dai Viet during the 18th century. One copper (đồng) coin was worth 3 zinc (kẽm) coins.
Beginning with the reign of Emperor Gia Long, both copper and zinc coins were in use. Originally the two coins had equal value, but eventually a copper coin rose to double the worth of a zinc coin, then triple, then sixfold, until the reign of Emperor Thành Thái, it was worth ten times a zinc coin.

Under French colonial rule, Vietnam used the units hào, xu, chinh, and cắc. After independence, Vietnam used đồng, hào, and xu, with 1 đồng equaling 10 hào or 100 xu. After the Vietnam War, chronic inflation caused both subdivisions to fall out of use, leaving đồng as the only unit of currency. However, Overseas Vietnamese communities continue to use hào and xu to refer to the tenth and hundredth denominations, respectively, of a foreign currency, such as xu for the American cent.

See also
Heavenly Stems & Earthly Branches
Units, Systems, & History of measurement
Chinese, Taiwanese, Hong Kong, Japanese, Mongolian & Korean units of measurement

References

Customary units of measurement
Science and technology in Vietnam
Systems of units
History of Vietnam
Units of measurement by country